Buka Passage is a narrow strait that separates Buka Island from the northern part of Bougainville Island, within the Autonomous Region of Bougainville of northeastern Papua New Guinea.

History
A number of shipwrecks are located in the passage.

The 1943 aerial photograph to the right shows the Buka Passage between Bougainville and Buka islands. Two Japanese airfields are visible, Buka Airfield (center) and Bonis Airfield (left).

Today, Buka Airfield has become Bougainville's major airport, whereas Bonis Airfield has been disused since World War II.

See also
 

Straits of Papua New Guinea
Geography of the Autonomous Region of Bougainville
Buka, Papua New Guinea